The submarines of France include nuclear attack submarines and nuclear ballistic missile submarines of various classes, operated by the French Navy as part of the French Submarine Forces.

Each French Navy vessel, including French submarines have for military awards and decorations their respective fanion insignia.

In service

Nuclear attack submarines

 
  (1987–present)
  (1988–present)
  (1992–present)
  (1993–present, in repair)

 
 Suffren (Q284) (2020–present)

Nuclear ballistic missile submarines 

 
  (1997–present)
  (1999–present)
  (2004–present)
  (2010–present)

Planned

Nuclear attack submarines
 
  (Laid down 2009; Launched 9 September 2022)
  (Laid down 2011)
  (Laid down 2014)
  (Laid down 2019)
  (Laid down 2020)

Nuclear ballistic missile submarines
 SNLE 3G-class

Retired from service 
Each French submarine from Gymnote onwards when ordered/constructed was given a sequential hull number (prefixed by the letter 'Q'). The sequence included submarines built in France for foreign navies, accounting for several gaps in the 'Q' numbering below.

1863 to 1903 
  (1863–1872)
  (Q1) (1888–1908)
  (Q2) (1893–1909)
  (Q3) (1899–1909)
  (Q4) (1900–1909)
 [[Sirène-class submarine (1901)|Sirène class ]] (1901–1919)
  (Q5)
  (Q6)
  (Q13)
  (Q14)
  (1901–1913)
  (Q7) renamed Follet (1908–1913)
  (Q8)
  (Q9)
  (Q10)
  (1901–1914)
  (Q11)
  (Q12)
  (1903–1914)
  (Q15)
  (Q16)
  (Q17)
  (Q18)
  (Q19)
  (Q20)
  (Q21)
  (Q22)
  (Q23)
  (Q24)
  (Q25)
  (Q26)
  (Q27)
  (Q28)
  (Q29)
  (Q30)
  (Q31)
  (Q32)
  (Q33)
  (Q34)

 1904 to 1919 
 Experimental types (varying designs) 
  (Q35) – renamed Dauphin 13 February 1911 (1904–1914)
  (Q36)
  (Q37) – (1905–1909)
 Aigrette class (1904–1919)
  (Q38)
  (Q39)
  (Q40)
 Émeraude class (1906–1919)
  (Q41)
  (Q42)
  (Q43)
  (Q44)
  (Q45)
  (Q46)
  (1907–1918)
  (Q47)
  (Q48)
 
 Guèpe 1 (Q49)
 Guèpe 2 (Q50)
 
  (Q51)
  (Q52)
  (Q53)
  (Q54)
  (Q55)
  (Q56)
  (Q57)
  (Q58)
  (Q59)
  (Q64)
  (Q65)
  (Q66)
   (Q67)
  (Q68)
  (Q69)
  (Q75)
  (Q76)
  (Q77)
  (Q73) (1909–1919)
  (Q89) (1911–1915)
  (Q74) (1911–1915)
  (1911–1930)
  (Q60)
  (Q62)
  (Q63)
  (Q70)
  (Q71)
  (Q72)
  (Q78)
  (Q79)
  (Q80)
  (Q81)
  (Q83)
  (Q84)
  (Q85)
  (Q86)
  (Q87)
  (Q88)
  (Q82) (1912–1919)
  (1913–1926)
  (Q90)
  (Q91)
  (1913–1937)
  (Q92)
  (Q93)
  (1914–1935)
  (Q94)
  (Q95)
  (Q96)
  (Q97)
  (Q98)
  (Q99)
  (Q100)
  (Q101)
  (1914–1935)
  (Q102)
  (Q103)
  (Q104)

  (1915–1935)
  (Q105)
  (Q106)
 Diane class (1915–1935)
  (Q107)
  (Q108)
  (1915–1935)
  (SD 2) ex-Japanese
  (SD 3) ex-Greek
  (SD 4) ex-Greek
  (1917–1935)
  (Q109)
  (Q110)
 Six more of this class (Q115-Q120) were in the 1915 Programme but were cancelled (never named)

  (1917–1937)
  (Q111)
  (Q112)
  (Q113)
  (Q114)
 UA class (Germany) (1918–1937)
 Jean-Autric (ex U-105)
 Léon Mignot (ex U-108)
 Pierre Marast (ex U-162)
 Jean Roulier (ex U-166)
 UE class (Germany) (1918–1935)
 Victor Reveille (ex U-79)
 René Audry (ex U-119)
 German Type U 139 submarine (Germany) (1918–1935)
 Helbronn (ex U-139)
 German Type UB II submarine (Germany) (1916–1937)
 Roland Morillot (ex UB-23)
 Trinité-Schillemans (ex UB-94)
 Carissan (ex UB-99)
 Jean Corre (ex UB-155)

 1919 to 1944 

  (1919–1935)
 O'Byrne 
 
  (1921–1936)
  (1921–1936)
 600 Series (1925–1946)
  (1925–1942)
 
 
 
 
  (1925–1942)
  (Q123)
  (Q124)
  (Q132)
  (Q133)
  (1927–1942)
  (Q125)
  (Q126)
  (Q134)
  (Q135)
  (1932–1946)
 
 
  (Q162)
  (Q176)
  (Q177)
  (1932–1943)
  (Q165)
  (Q166)
  (1932–1946)
  (NN4)
 
  (Q159)
  (Q160)
  (Q161)
  (Q163)
  (Q164)
  (Q174)
  (Q175)
 Requin class (1926–1946)
  (Q115)
  (Q116)
   (Q117)
  (Q118)
  (Q119)
  (Q120)
  (Q127)
  (Q128)
  (Q129)
  Saphir class Minelaying submarines (1930–1949)
  (Q145)
  (Q146)
  (Q152)
  (Q158)
   (Q173)
  (Q184)
 Redoutable class (1931–1952)
 Type M-5
  (Q136)
  (Q137)
 Type M-6
  (Q138)
  (Q139)
  (Q140)
  (Q141)
  (Q142)
  (Q143)
  (Q144)
  (Q147)
   (Q148)
  (Q149)
  (Q150)
  (Q151)
   (Q153)
  (Q154)
  (Q155)
  (Q156)
  (Q157)
  (Q167)
  (Q168)
  (Q169)
  (Q170)
  (Q171)
  (Q172)
  (Q178)
  (Q179)
  (Q180)
  (Q181)
  (Q182)
  (Q183)
  (1934–1942)

  (1936–1954)
  (Q185)
  (Q186)
  (Q187)
  (Q188)
   (Q189)
  (Q190)
  (1943–1946)
 
 
 
  (1940–1960)
 
 
  – never completed
 
 
 
 
 Antigone (Q202) – construction abandoned 1940
 Andromaque (Q203) – construction abandoned 1940
 
 Armide (Q207) – construction abandoned 1940
 Hermione (Q211) – construction abandoned 1940
 Gorgone (Q212) – construction abandoned 1940
 Clorinde (Q213) – construction abandoned 1940
 Cornélie (Q214) – construction abandoned 1940
 Roland Morillot class (cancelled 1940)
 
 
 
 
 
 unnamed (Q228)
 unnamed (Q229)
 unnamed (Q230)
  Minelaying submarines (authorised only, cancelled 1940)
 Émeraude (Q197)
 Agate (Q208)
 Corail (Q209)
 Escarboucle (Q210)
  (cancelled 1940)
 Vendémiaire (Q215)
 Brumaire (Q216)
 Frimaire (Q217)
 Nivôse (Q218)
 Pluviôse (Q219)
 Ventôse (Q220)
 Germinal (Q221)
 Floréal (Q222)
 Prairial (Q223)
 Messidor (Q224)
 Thermidor (Q225)
 Fructidor (Q226)
 Phénix (Q227)

1944 to 1971 
 German Type VII submarine (Germany) (1944–1963)
 Millé  (ex )
  (ex ) (Germany) (1945–1959)
 German Type IX submarine
 Blaison (ex )
 Bouan (ex )
 Type XXI submarine (Germany) (1946–1967)
  (ex U-2518)
 Type XXIII submarine (Germany) (1946)
 
  (United Kingdom) (1951–1959)
 Sibylle (ex – )
 Saphir (ex – )
 Sirène (ex – )
 Sultane (ex – )
 Narval class (1957–1992)
  (Q231)
  (Q232)
  (Q233)
  (Q234)
  (Q237)
  (Q238)
  (1958–1981)
  (Q235)
  (Q236)
  (Q239)
  (Q240)
  (1964–1996)
  (Q241)
  (Q242)
  (Q243)
  (Q245)
  (Q246)
  (Q247)
  (Q248)
  (Q249)
  (Q250)
  (Q253)
  (Q254)
  (Q251) (1966–1986)

1971 to present 

  (1971–2008)
  (Q252) (1971–1991)
  (Q255) (1973–1996)
  (Q257) (1974–1998)
  (1976–2005)
  (1980–1999)
  (1985–2008)
  (1977–2001)
  (1977–1997)
  (1977–1998)
  (1978–2000)
  (1978–2001)

  (1984 – )
  (1984–2019)
 Rubis (S601) (1983-2022) (departed Toulon in late October for the Cherbourg Naval Base for decommissioning)

See also 
 List of active French Navy ships
 List of Escorteurs of the French Navy
 List of battleships of France
 List of aircraft carriers of France
 List of French Air and Space Force aircraft squadrons

Notes

References 

 Les Sous-Marins de la Marine Nationale (Submarines of the French Navy)
 Henri Le Masson Du Nautilus (1800) au Redoutable (Presses de la Cité, Paris, 1969)

External links 
 www.battleships-cruisers.co.uk – Classes of French Submarines
 uboat.net – History, French & Allied Submarines in World War II

French Navy
French naval components

France
Submarine